"La vie par procuration" is a song by Jean-Jacques Goldman which became a hit single in 1986. It was recorded originally for the album Non homologué that was released in 1985. However it was a live version of the recording during a concert and made available through the live Jean-Jacques Goldman album En public that became a commercial hit, staying 21 weeks in the French Singles Chart making it to number 2 in December 1986. It was certified gold in 1987 with reported 500,000 copies sold.

Personnel
Michael Jones - Guitar, backing vocals
Claude Le Péron - Bass, backing vocals
Jean-François Gauthier - drums, backing vocals
Lance Dixon, Philippe Grandvoinet - Synthesizer, backing vocals
Prof Pinpin - Saxophone, backing vocals
Andy Scott and Pascale Potrel - mixing
Marc Lumbroso and Jean-Jacques Goldman - Direction
Yves Jaget - Recording
Émile Assier - Photography of cover

Covers
The song is very popular and has been covered and adapted many times.

In 2008, Israeli DJ Offer Nissim released a lengthened remixed version of 8 minutes 35 seconds titled "La Vie Par Procuration (Offer Nissim 08' Reconstruction)". The remix also appears in his album Happy People released on October 28, 2008.

The song was covered by Leslie & Pauline on the 2013 Jean-Jacques Goldman tribute album Génération Goldman Volume 2 and an official music video was also released.

Charts
Jean-Jacques Goldman

Leslie & Pauline

References

1985 songs
1986 singles
Jean-Jacques Goldman songs
Songs written by Jean-Jacques Goldman
Epic Records singles